Alas Chiricanas (Spanish: Chiriquí Wings) was a commuter airline based in Panama, which was operational from 1980 to 1995.

Fleet 
Their fleet contained Embraer EMB 110 Bandeirantes, although they also operated the Dash 7 in fierce competition with Aeroperlas, a Panamanian regional airline.

Accidents and incidents
In 1994, Alas Chiricanas Flight 00901 exploded while en route from Colón to Panama City. All 18 passengers and three crew were killed. The explosion was caused by a bomb. The militant Islamic group Hezbollah was suspected of masterminding the attack, even though Panama had no connection with the Israeli–Palestinian conflict.

The aircraft is said to have crashed on a wooded hillside following an in-flight explosion. Twelve Jewish businessmen were among the passengers.

After the accident, the company went out of business, and Aeroperlas absorbed part of its fleet.

References

 
Defunct airlines of Panama
Airlines established in 1980
Airlines disestablished in 1995
1980 establishments in Panama
1995 disestablishments in North America